St. Cecilia and the Gypsy Soul is the eighth studio album by English hard rock band the Quireboys. It was released on 30 March 2015 as part of a 4-disc set.

Background
Following Black Eyed Sons (2014) and Beautiful Curse (2013), St. Cecilia and the Gypsy Soul completes a hat-trick of studio albums since the band's revived post-millennial popularity and success. Returning to Lemon Studios in Klippan, Sweden, where they recorded the acoustic album Halfpenny Dancer (2009), the band was inspired by their acoustic efforts with the intention of repeating the formula for a similar such release. However, a sudden change in intrigue shifted their focus instead to record a stripped down album that experimented with instruments in what became their most diverse and eclectic opus yet. A nod to the band's rootsy legacy, St. Cecilia and the Gypsy Soul reaffirmed the band's desire to break new ground and grow their sound, while remaining faithful to their creative soul as self-styled gypsy kings.

Track listing

Touring
Prior to release, and in continuation of the band's 30th anniversary celebrations, the band announced a series of intimate shows beginning in the United Kingdom. The shows involved classic tracks, rarities, surprises as well as a selection of new material, played in unplugged arrangements.

Tour dates

Personnel
Band members
 Jonathan "Spike" Gray – lead vocals
 Guy Griffin – lead guitar, rhythm guitar, backing vocals
 Paul Guerin – lead guitar, rhythm guitar, backing vocals
 Keith Weir – keyboards, backing vocals
 Dave McCluskey – drums
 Nick Malling – bass guitar

Additional musicians
Martin Ekelund – drums, bass, percussion, cello, minimoog

Production
Martin Ekelund and the Quireboys – producing, mixing, mastering
Jonni Davis – artwork concept

References

The Quireboys albums
2015 albums